The 2018 Debmarine Namibia Cup is the 25th edition of the Namibia FA Cup, the knockout football competition of Namibia.

Round of 32
[Mar 24, Etosha Stadium, Tsumeb]

Swakopmund FC          5-1 Ohangwena NAMPOL       

Once Again             w/o Rhino FC               [Rhino FC withdrew]

Space Age              0-3 Khomas NAMPOL          

Khuse                  0-0 Tigers                 [4-2 pen]

[Mar 24, Sam Nujoma Stadium, Windhoek]

Real Fighters         0-11 Eleven Arrows          

Omaheke NAMPOL        0-12 African Stars          

Citizens               2-2 Young Chiefs           [5-6 pen]

[Mar 25, Etosha Stadium, Tsumeb]

Rundu Chiefs           0-2 Civics                 

Chief Santos           4-0 Reho Madrid            

Blue Waters            4-0 Fresh United           

Orlando Pirates        3-1 Outjo Academy          

Eastern Chiefs         2-7 Unam                   

Dynamos                1-1 Onathinge United       [5-4 pen]

Golden Bees            1-1 Life Fighters          [4-3 pen]

[Mar 25, Sam Nujoma Stadium, Windhoek]

Tura Magic             0-0 Mighty Gunners         [5-4 pen]

Black Africa           2-2 Young African          [10-9 pen]

Round of 16
[Apr 21, Kuisebmond Stadium, Walvis Bay]

Tura Magic             9-1 Swakopmund FC          

Khuse                  1-1 Black Africa           [0-2 pen]

Blue Waters            2-1 Young Chiefs           

Eleven Arrows          1-1 Orlando Pirates        [4-3 pen]

[Apr 21, Sam Nujoma Stadium, Windhoek]

Khomas NAMPOL          0-0 Golden Bees            [4-5 pen]

Once Again            1-10 Civics                 

African Stars          6-0 Dynamos                

Chief Santos           0-4 Unam

Quarterfinals
[Apr 27, Sam Nujoma Stadium, Windhoek]

Civics                 1-1 Tura Magic             [4-3 pen]

[Apr 28, Sam Nujoma Stadium, Windhoek]

Golden Bees            1-4 Black Africa           

Unam                   2-0 Blue Waters            

Eleven Arrows          0-0 African Stars          [4-5 pen]

Semifinals
[May 12, Sam Nujoma Stadium, Windhoek]

Black Africa           1-1 Unam                   [aet, 3-5 pen]

Civics                 1-2 African Stars          [aet]

Final
[May 19, Sam Nujoma Stadium, Windhoek]

Unam                   0-1 African Stars

See also
2017–18 Namibia Premier League

References

Namibia
Cup
Football competitions in Namibia